Lamium purpureum, known as red dead-nettle, purple dead-nettle, or purple archangel, is an annual herbaceous flowering plant native to Europe and Asia.

Varieties:
 Lamium purpureum var. hybridum (Vill.) Vill. (synonym: Lamium hybridum Vill.)

Description
Lamium purpureum grows with square stems to 5–20 cm
(rarely 30 cm) in height. The leaves have fine hairs, are green at the bottom and shade to purplish at the top; they are 2–4 cm long and broad, with a 1–2 cm petiole (leaf stalk), and wavy to serrated margins.

The zygomorphic flowers are bright red-purple, with a top hood-like petal, two lower lip petal lobes and minute fang-like lobes between. The corolla shows a line of hairs near the base of the tube. They may be produced throughout the year, including mild weather in winter. This allows bees to gather its nectar for food when few other nectar sources are available.  It is also a prominent source of pollen for bees in March/April (in UK), when bees need the pollen as protein to build up their nest.

It is often found alongside Henbit Dead-nettle (Lamium amplexicaule), which is easily mistaken for it since they both have similar looking leaves and similar bright purple flowers; they can be distinguished by the stalked leaves of Red Dead-nettle on the flower stem, compared to the unstalked leaves of Henbit Dead-nettle.

Though superficially similar to species of Urtica (true nettles) in appearance, it is not related and does not sting, hence the name "dead-nettle".

Uses
Young plants have edible tops and leaves, used in salads or in stir-fry as a spring vegetable. If finely chopped it can also be used in sauces.

Undyed, the pollen itself is a red colour and is very noticeable on the heads of bees that frequent its flowers.

Folk herbalists use purple dead nettle in many herbal remedies. One of these is purple dead nettle salve that can be used on irritated, itchy, or sore skin.

Habitat
Frequent in meadows, forest edges, roadsides and gardens.

Distribution
Lamium purpureum is a common weed in the western United States, Canada, Ireland, and the British Isles.

Biochemistry
The essential oil is characterized by its high contents of germacrene D. The seed oil contains 16% of an acid characterized as (−)-octadeca-5,6-trans-16-trienoic acid (trivial name `lamenallenic acid'). Other unsaturated esters identified by their cleavage products are oleate, linoleate and linolenate.

The plant contains phenylethanoid glycosides named lamiusides A, B, C, D and E. It possesses a flavonol 3-O-glucoside-6″-O-malonyltransferase.

Gallery

References

External links
 
 Jepson Manual Treatment
 USDA Plants Profile
 Photo gallery
 Botanical Society of Britain and Ireland information for Lamium purpureum L. 

purpureum
Flora of Europe
Flora of Asia
Plants described in 1753
Taxa named by Carl Linnaeus